Scalextric is a brand of slot car racing sets which first appeared in the late 1950s. The Scalextric were first invented by engineer B. Fred Francis, when he added an electric motor to the Scalex tin cars that were produced by Minimodels Ltd, his own company The first "Scalextric" were first made in Havant, Hampshire, in 1956.

The brand is currently owned and distributed by Hornby.

History 

The forerunner to Scalextric was Scalex, which Francis first produced through the company Minimodels Ltd which he had founded in 1947. The company was based in London and made tinplate toys and models. Early products included the Startex toy car range and the very popular Scalex, which was introduced in 1952. Scalex was a range of toy racing cars with clockwork motors which were activated by pulling out the steering wheel.

In 1952, Minimodels moved to a larger factory in New Lane, Havant to meet the growing demand for the toy cars. At the peak of its popularity, over 7,000 Scalex models were being produced weekly. By 1956, the novelty of clockwork racing cars had worn off and sales began to fall. Eventually the future of the company and its one hundred employees was threatened.

In an attempt to revive his company's flagging fortunes, Fred Francis began to look at alternatives. He was inspired by seeing model car racing tracks, but wanted to develop the player's control of the car so as to increase the sense of competition. He experimented by putting small electric motors into Scalex cars and running them on model railway track. Next he introduced rubber slotted track and gave the cars a 'gimbal' wheel to pick up the electric current in the groove of the track. Original tin-plate cars had one hard plastic rear wheel and one rubber-tyred wheel, with gave different handling characteristics for left and right corners. Power was supplied by batteries hidden in a little cardboard hut, with players having their own on-off button to control their cars. Therefore Scalex-electric became Scalextric.

Scalextric was unveiled at the Harrogate Toy Fair in 1957 to immediate acclaim. It appealed to both adults and children as it combined speed, competition and the glamour of Formula One motor racing. Demand for the toy was immense and the Minimodels factory struggled to keep up with the orders.

In 1958, Fred Francis sold the Minimodels company to Lines Brothers (who operated as "Tri-ang"). The popularity of Scalextric continued. In 1960, plastic bodies replaced the original tinplate, and in 1961, production moved to a new factory in the Leigh Park area of Havant. By 1964, Scalextric was being advertised as 'the most complete model motor racing system in the world'.

Production of Scalextric was transferred to Rovex in 1968 (although the Minimodels factory remained open until the early 1970s). It is now owned by Hornby Hobbies of England.

Products

The first model Francis introduced in his Scalex line of tin-plate clockwork cars was the Jaguar XK120. These 1:32 scale models had some unique features, including a clockwork motor which was not wound by a key but by a 'fifth wheel' device. This wheel is found under the chassis behind the front axle, and works by pressing the car down on a hard surface and being pulled backwards. This wound the clockwork motor and when the car was released it shot forward at speed. The Scalex range expanded to include six cars: the MG TF, Austin-Healey 100, Aston Martin DB2, Jaguar 2.4 Saloon, Maserati 250F and Ferrari 375. The last two were in a slightly different 1:28 scale.

Scalex was very successful: at one point the company was producing up to 7,000 cars a week. Later cars also featured a steerable front axle which could be set at an angle and the cars would then run in an arc.

Most Scalextric models are 1:32 scale, though between 1968 and 1970 Super 124 cars and track were manufactured at 1:24 scale. In 1994 Micro Scalextric at 1:64 scale was introduced. Cars and track are not compatible between scales.

At the beginning of the 21st century, Scalextric track underwent a major redesign to make it easier to assemble. The new design is known as Scalextric Sport and can be connected to the original track using special adaptor pieces. The new track was designed to be compatible with all earlier 1:32 cars.

Many other manufacturers, including the likes of Fly, Slot.it, SCX, Airfix/MRRC, Carrera and Ninco, produce cars that can run on Scalextric track with minor or no modification.

In 2004 "Scalextric Sport Digital" (SSD) was introduced, which allows up to four digital cars to be raced in a single slot. The cars can change from one slot to another using special slot-lane change tracks, the lane change or otherwise being controlled by a button on the throttle. Sport Digital cars will run on analogue layouts without modification, but analogue cars require a digital decoder to be installed before they can run on a digital layout.

Many of the original Scalextric cars can be fitted with a digital decoder, depending on available space within the body shell. Performance of converted cars on a digital system can vary, but enthusiasts have been able to successfully convert a wide range of cars, both from Scalextric and other brands.

As use of Scalextric Digital has increased, a community has established itself where users have developed enhanced powerbase functionality, fuel management and timing systems for increased realism.

To convert Scalextric Sport into Scalextric Digital requires a digital power base, power supply (transformer), lane changing track (to utilise the full benefits), and digital controllers.

In late 2010, Scalextric released a revised six-car digital powerbase, C7042. This powerbase includes a separate screen which aids set-up and also displays race information such as lap times. The company worked closely with customers when developing the new system. The result includes features such as yellow flag options for dealing with crashed cars, ghost cars to race against which can run and change lanes automatically, and the ability to race in analogue mode for older models that have not been converted to digital.

In Spain, Hornby Scalextric is marketed under the brand Superslot, as the Scalextric brand is owned there by Scale Competition Xtreme, whose products are sold internationally under the SCX brand. Whilst there are some common standards, parts of the two ranges, particularly in their digital offerings, are not compatible.

Sets
Scalextric is typically sold as a set containing enough track to make a circuit, the necessary power supply and throttles, and two cars. The cars are usually based on real vehicles from Formula 1, A1 Grand Prix, NASCAR, rallying, touring, or Le Mans, or based on ordinary road-going cars. A number of novelty sets have been produced, such as horse racing sets and 360-degree sets. The latter, produced sporadically since the 1960s, have a specially made guide that enables the car to run back the way it has come by spinning through 180 degrees.

Power and control
Scalextric is controlled with a hand-held plunger, connected by wire to a connector on the set. A set normally has two to six plungers included. Mounted in the track (for each lane) are two metal rails, which for Analogue carry the DC current from the controllers, or for Digital have constant AC current passed through them, in either case picked up by two metal braids or plates on the underside of the racing cars.

TV and film licensing 
Since the 1960s, Scalextric have offered TV and film tie-ins, beginning with the now rare and valuable James Bond 007 set, featuring an Aston Martin with action features as shown in the film Goldfinger. Even the 'baddie' car in this set, a Mercedes, had action features of its own, whilst the set also sported many other unique action points and props.
It was some time before Scalextric returned to licensing in the 1970s, first with The Amazing Spider-Man (the 1970s series), which had specially liveried TR7 cars and white track. Then, in the 1980s, came the original TV series based Teenage Mutant Ninja Turtles, Power Rangers, Knight Rider and then Tim Burton's Batman film.

Since then the franchises have grown to include Batman Begins, The Simpsons, The Transformers movie, James Bond 007 films Quantum of Solace, Skyfall, GoldenEye and Spectre, Starsky and Hutch, The Italian Job (models from both the original and re-made films), Top Gear, Star Wars and the Pixar/Disney movie Toy Story.

Many of these have appeared in both 1:32 and 1:64 scales.

Scalextric also produced a Dukes of Hazzard General Lee car and more recently a twin car pack with licensing from the Fast and the Furious film franchise.

Scalextric has also recently licensed the Need for Speed brand from Electronic Arts and has produced a set based on the popular video game series.

On 22 November 2004, thieves stole 2,500 Simpsons Scalextric sets from the back of a lorry which was parked near services on the M2 motorway in England.

Vehicles
In addition to various types of cars, Scalextric vehicles have included motorbikes, sidecars, go-karts, pickup trucks, SUVs, racing trucks, articulated trucks, horses, skateboards and bicycles.

Track
Standard track consists of straights of various lengths and corners of different radii and degree of turn. Special track includes several different styles of chicane, cross-over tracks, crossroad track and humpback bridge. Novelty pieces of track have included pit lane tracks, Le Mans start, blow-out track and loop-the-loop tracks.

There are five generations of 1:32 scale Scalextric track:
Original Scalextric Track (Mk. 1): This was made from rubber with thin, vertical electrical connectors, and held together with separate metal clips. This track had white lines between the lanes. Track produced during the 'Minimodels era' was slightly glossy, and curved sections had side protrusions to allow for the attachment of the supplied crash barrier. Later 'Triang era' Mk 1 track dispensed with these, possibly because they thwarted future additions like outer radius curves. The later iteration had a more realistic matt finish to its road surface. The earliest track had a dedicated 'power straight' for the connections to each lane, whereas the later one used power clips that were held in place between the contacts of any two track sections including curves. It was during this transition that the original on/off button control gave way to hand-held plungers with a greater degree of speed control.
 
Original Scalextric Track (Mk. 2): Released in 1962, the material became plastic, electrical connections were through wider, horizontal pins, and the track was held together by two integrated circular, spoon-shaped pins and sockets moulded into each end. Converter pieces were available to link the two types. It is now known as Classic track. Classic track is compatible with another leading brand, SCX's classic track.
Scalextric Sport: Released in 2001, another plastic track, but with a smoother surface. The track connectors are square and slot into place unlike the ring shaped Classic track ones. Converter pieces are available to link to Classic track.
Scalextric Digital: Released in 2004, Scalextric Digital is compatible with Sport. It allows up to 6 cars on a 2 lane track at one time, with each car fully controllable. This was a feature previously unavailable from Scalextric.
Scalextric Start: Released in 2010, Scalextric Start aims to be a basic track for children. It has only one type of straight and corner, and each set can be made up into various layouts; the cars included in the sets are fantasy models, which reduce manufacturers' licensing costs, and a converter track piece is available to allow cars to cross from Start track to Sport and back again.

Scalextric racing in popular culture

The character Bryn Cartwright, played by William Thomas, is seen in multiple scenes playing Scalextric in the 1997 Welsh dark comedy film, Twin Town.

In 2009, BBC Top Gear presenter James May announced plans to recreate the full length Brooklands racing track using Scalextric track and cars. This was undertaken with a team of 350 volunteers building the track from an uncounted number of pieces of Scalextric track, navigating ponds and roads, closely following the route of the old Brooklands track. This event broke the Guinness World Record for the longest ever Scalextric track in the world, intended to measure the original  of the original Brooklands circuit but in reality recording  in length, because of the need to navigate modern features that block the original course. The episode was first shown on BBC2 on 17 November 2009 as part of James May's Toy Stories.

Early Scalextric cars as they appeared
1957 – Metal-bodied Ferrari 375 and Maserati 250F with gimbal pick-up
1st edition catalogue 1960 – C54 Lotus, C55 Vanwall, C56 Lister Jaguar, C57 Aston Martin
2nd edition catalogue 1961 – C58 Cooper Car Company, C59 BRM, C60 Jaguar D-type, C61 Porsche Spyder
3rd edition catalogue 1962 – C62 Ferrari, C63 Lotus, C64 Bentley, C65 Alfa Romeo, E1 Lister Jaguar with lights, E2 Aston Martin DBR with lights
4th edition catalogue 1963 – C66 Cooper, C67 Lotus, C68 Aston Martin, C69 Ferrari GT, C70 Bugatti, C71 Auto Union, E3 Aston Martin with lights, E4 Ferrari GT with lights
5th edition catalogue 1964 – C72 BRM, C73 Porsche, C74 Austin-Healey 3000, C75 Mercedes 190SL, E5 Marshal's car with lights
6th edition catalogue 1965 – C76 Mini Cooper,
7th edition catalogue 1966 – C77 Ford GT40, C78 AC Cobra, C79 Offenhauser front engine, C80 Offenhauser rear engine, C81 Cooper, C82 Lotus, C83 Sunbeam Tiger C84 Triumph TR4A, C85 BRM, C86 Porsche, C87 Vanwall, C88 Cooper, C89 BRM, 90 Ferrari, C91 D-Type Jaguar, C92 Porsche
8th edition catalogue 1967 – C75 Mercedes 190SL Sports (James Bond), C97 Aston Martin (James Bond)
9th edition catalogue 1968 – C1 Alpine Renault, C2 Matra Jet, C3 Javelin Special, C4 Electra Special, C5 Europa Vee, C6 Panther, C7 Rally Mini Cooper, C32 Mercedes 250SL, C99 Fiat 600
10th edition catalogue 1969 – C8 Lotus Indianapolis, C9 Ferrari, C14 Mantra GP, C15 Ford Mirage, C16 Ferrari P4, C17 Lamborghini Miura, C18 Ford 3l GT, C19 Scalextric Team Car, C36 Honda GP
11th edition catalogue 1970 – C20 Dart GP, C21 Cougar Sports
12th edition catalogue 1971 – C22 Porsche 917GT, C23 Scaletti-Arrow, C24 Team Car MkII, C34 Jaguar E-type, C37 BRM
13th edition catalogue 1972 – C26 March Ford 721, C41 Ferrari GT330, C43 McLaren M9A, C44 Mercedes Wankel C111
14th edition catalogue 1973 – C25 Ferrari 312B2, C28 Renault Alpine, C37 BRM, C46 Porsche 917K, C47 Tyrrell Ford, C50 JPS Lotus 72

Micro Scalextric 
Micro Scalextric (or MicroScalextric, as appears on product boxes) was launched on 1 February 1994 (then known as Scalextric Micro MR-1) at the Olympia toy fair. It became available to the public in October of that year and used a much smaller track geometry to the standard Scalextric product. Many of the Micro MR-1 models were re-badged products manufactured by Marchon, Inc. In 1995, again at the Olympia toy fair, a new track system was introduced along with new vehicles. At the same time Scalextric Micro MR-1 was re-branded as Micro Scalextric. The Micro Scalextric range is aimed at children four years of age or older and has a scale of 1:64 and is often, incorrectly, described as HO scale (1:87). There is also a 'My first Scalextric' range, aimed at 3-year olds. In February 2019 a new track system was introduced. Warner Bros have licensed a number of Looney Tunes characters for use in the Micro Scalextric range of products. The latest (2019) range Micro Scalextric slot car motors run on 9v, which is different to earlier Micro Scalextric vehicles.

Notes

References

External links

 
 Scalextric races on to the Net from The Register
 The Old Toy Guide – Gallery and Information about old Scalextric
 Mis circuitos de slot. The biggest collection of designs in the world  
 Scalextric Collector Guide – Online database of Scalextric sets, cars, trucks, bikes : 1960 – 1996 

Companies based in Hampshire
Havant
Lines Bros
Hornby Railways
Slot car brands
Toy companies of the United Kingdom